Masters of Chant Chapter VII is the tenth album by Gregorian. The album was released September 25, 2009.

Track listing 
 "Meadows of Heaven" (Nightwish)
 "One" (U2)
 "It Will Be Forgiven"
 "Sweet Child of Mine" (Guns N' Roses)
 "A Face in the Crowd" (Tom Petty)
 "The Carpet Crawlers" (Genesis)
 "Arrival" (ABBA)
 "Enjoy the Silence" (Depeche Mode)
 "A Whiter Shade of Pale" (Procol Harum)
 "Running Up that Hill" (Kate Bush)
 "Molly Ban" (Irish traditional music)
 "Kashmir" (Led Zeppelin)
 "Chasing Cars" (Snow Patrol)
 "Don't Leave Me Now" (Supertramp)

2009 albums
Gregorian (band) albums